Commercial Bank Cameroon (CBC), also referred to as Commercial Bank of Cameroon, is a commercial bank in Cameroon. It is one of the 14 Cameroonian commercial banks licensed by the Central Bank of Central African States, the national banking regulator. The bank caters to both individuals and businesses through a variety of financial products. CBC is the flagship of the Commercial Bank Group, headquartered in Douala, Cameroon, with subsidiaries in Chad, Central African Republic, Equatorial Guinea and São Tomé and Príncipe.

History
In 1997, following the closure of the Cameroonian operations of several International banks, including Crédit Agricole, BICIC and Meridien BIAO, Cameroonian corporate investors, private Cameroonian citizens and the German Investment Corporation (DEG), pooled resources and put together FCFA 3 billion (approximately US$6.5 million) to start Commercial Bank of Cameroon. Over the years, the owners of CBC have expanded their operations to four other Central African countries. , the Commercial Bank of Cameroon had an estimated capital base of US$19 million and total assets of about US$309 million.

Commercial Bank Group
, the following companies comprise the Commercial Bank Group:

 Commercial Bank of Cameroon (CBC) -  Cameroon
 Commercial Bank Chad (CBT) -  Chad
 Commercial Bank Centrafrique (CBCA) -  Central African Republic
 Commercial Bank Equatorial Guinea (CBGE) -  Equatorial Guinea
 Commercial Bank São Tomé and Príncipe (CBSTP) -  São Tomé and Príncipe
 SFA Financial Products -  Cameroon - Commercial Bank Group has 51.4% shareholding.

Ownership
The stock of Commercial Bank Cameroon, is privately owned by Cameroonian and foreign investors. The major shareholders are listed in the table below:

Branch network
The bank maintains branches at the following locations:

 Maroua Branch - Maroua
 Garoua Branch - Boulevard Lamido Hayatou, Garoua
 Bafoussam Branch - Avenue de la Republique, Bafoussam
 Akwa Branch - Boulevard de l'Unite, Akwa
 Douala Branch - Boulevard Charles De Gaulle, Douala Main Branch
 Yaoundé Branch - Yaoundé

See also
 Commercial Bank Centrafrique
 Commercial Bank Group
 List of banks in Cameroon
 Central Bank of Central African States

References

External links
 Website of Commercial Bank Cameroon (French & English
 Website of Central Bank of Central African States (French)
 Overview of Cameroonian Commercial Banks

Banks of Cameroon
Banks established in 1997
Douala